Michael Jacobson is an American politician, businessman, and banker serving as a member of the Nebraska Legislature from the 42nd district. He was appointed by Governor Pete Ricketts on February 23, 2022.

Early life and education 
Jacobson was raised on a farm in Sutton, Nebraska and attended Sutton High School. He earned a Bachelor of Science degree in agricultural economics and education from the University of Nebraska–Lincoln and attended the University of Colorado Boulder's graduate banking program.

Career 
After graduating from college, Jacobson worked as a teacher and farmer in Red Cloud, Nebraska. He later worked as an agricultural lending officer for City National Bank in Hastings, Nebraska. He later worked as a senior vice president at the National Bank of Commerce in Lincoln, Nebraska. In 1998, Jacobson founded NebraskaLand Bank. Jacobson has also served as chair of the North Platte Redevelopment Authority and North Platte Airport Authority. He was appointed to the Nebraska Legislature by Governor Pete Ricketts in February 2022, succeeding Mike Groene.

Electoral history

References 

Living people
American bankers
Republican Party Nebraska state senators
University of Nebraska–Lincoln alumni
University of Colorado Boulder alumni
Businesspeople from Nebraska
Farmers from Nebraska
People from Sutton, Nebraska
People from Clay County, Nebraska
People from North Platte, Nebraska
Year of birth missing (living people)